Emile-Edgar (Milou) Jeunehomme (1924–2001) was a Belgian liberal politician.

On 15 January 1958 he became a member of parliament for the district Liège. He played for a long time an important role in the liberal party under Omer Vanaudenhove but gradually withdrew himself from politics after 1969. He was co-president of the liberal party in 1968–1969, together with Norbert Hougardy.

Sources
 Presidents of the Belgian liberal party

1924 births
2001 deaths
Belgian politicians
Walloon movement activists
Walloon people